TMA may refer to:

Science 
 Tense–Modality–Aspect or tense–aspect–mood, grammatical system
 Tetramethylammonium ion or its salts
 Thermomechanical analysis
 Third man argument, a philosophical criticism of Plato's theory of Forms
 Thrombotic microangiopathy
 Tissue microarray, device for analysing many histological tissue samples
 Transcription mediated amplification
 Trimethylamine, (CH3)3N, a simple amine
 Trimethylaluminium, (CH3)3Al
 Psychedelic or hallucinogenic drugs that are isomeric-substituted amphetamines:
 3,4,5-trimethoxyamphetamine (TMA)
 2,4,5-trimethoxyamphetamine (TMA-2)
 2,3,4-trimethoxyamphetamine (TMA-3)
 2,3,5-trimethoxyamphetamine (TMA-4)
 2,3,6-trimethoxyamphetamine (TMA-5)
 2,4,6-trimethoxyamphetamine (TMA-6)
 Tristeza y muerte de agave, a collective term for diseases of blue agave

Transportation

Aviation 
 Terminal Manoeuvring Area / Terminal Control Area - aviation term for a controlled high-volume airspace
 Trans Maldivian Airways
 TMA Cargo, Lebanese airline

Engineering 
 TMA Engineering, UK
 Truck-mounted attenuator, crash attenuator

Space exploration
 Russian Soyuz spacecraft missions; TMA are the Russian initials for Transport Modified Anthropometric
 Soyuz TMA-1, launched 30 October 2002
 Soyuz TMA-2, launched 26 April 2003
 Soyuz TMA-3, launched 18 October 2003
 Soyuz TMA-4, launched 19 April 2004
 Soyuz TMA-5, launched 14 October 2004
 Soyuz TMA-6, launch 15 April 2005
 other Soyuz-TMA missions

Military
Target Motion Analysis, by submarine SONAR
Tanzania Military Academy
 Yugoslavian landmines:
 TMA-1 mine
 TMA-2 mine
 TMA-3 mine
 TMA-4 mine

Communications
 Television Market Area, official designation of the U.S. Federal Communications Commission
 Tower Mounted Amplifier or masthead amplifier

Medicine 
 Tissue microarray, a paraffin block in which tissue cores are assembled in array fashion to allow multiplex histological analysis

Other 
 Tehsil Municipal Administration
 Texas A&M Maritime Academy, at Texas A&M University at Galveston
 Theatre Musicians Association, US
 TMA Awards of the UK Theatrical Management Association
 Total Media Agency, a Japanese pornographic video production company
 The Mod Archive, a web index and archive of playable music module files